Mustafayev (Russian: Мустафаев, Ukrainian: Мустафаєв) is an Azerbaijani masculine surname slavicized from the Arabic masculine given name Mustafa and the Russian ending "-(y)ev"; its feminine counterpart is Mustafayeva. Notable people with this surname include:

Ali Mustafayev (1952–1991), Azerbaijani journalist
Asan Mustafayev (born 1965), Ukrainian football coach and former player
Aytən Mustafayeva (born 1968), Azerbaijani politician
Bakir Mustafayev (1898–1978), Azerbaijani soldier
Bunyamudin Mustafayev (born 1992), Russian footballer
Chingiz Mustafayev (journalist) (1960–1992), Azerbaijani journalist
Emil Mustafayev (born 2001), Ukrainian football player
Eskender Mustafaiev (born 1981), Ukrainian swimmer
Firuz Mustafayev, Prime minister of Azerbaijan 1992
Imam Mustafayev (1910–1997), Azerbaijani politician
Khydyr Mustafayev (1905–1975), Azerbaijani military officer
Kseniya Moustafaeva (born 1995), French rhythmic gymnast
Magomed Mustafaev (born 1988), Russian mixed martial artist
Nataliya Mustafayeva (born 1985), Azerbaijani rower
Roshen Mustafayev (1960–2009), Azerbaijani political scientist
Rustam Mustafayev (1910–1940), Azerbaijani scenic designer
Server Mustafayev
Shahin Mustafayev (born 1965), Azerbaijani politician
Vagif Mustafayev (born 1953), Azerbaijani film director, producer and screenwriter
Vugar Mustafayev (born 1994), Azerbaijani football midfielder

Azerbaijani-language surnames
Russian-language surnames
Patronymic surnames
Surnames from given names